Silvio Alverà (December 17, 1921 – July 25, 1985) was an Italian alpine skier who competed in the 1948 Winter Olympics and in the 1952 Winter Olympics. He was born in Cortina d'Ampezzo.

In 1948 he finished fourth in the alpine skiing slalom competition, fifth in the combined event, and sixth in the downhill competition.

References

External links
 
 Alpine skiing 1948 

1921 births
1985 deaths
People from Cortina d'Ampezzo
Italian male alpine skiers
Olympic alpine skiers of Italy
Alpine skiers at the 1948 Winter Olympics
Alpine skiers at the 1952 Winter Olympics
Sportspeople from the Province of Belluno
20th-century Italian people